Victor Ikechukwu Agbo (born December 19, 1980) is a Nigerian retired footballer.

Career
He spent most of his career in Serbia where he represented several top and lower league clubs, namely FK BSK Borča, FK Žitorađa, FK Grafičar Beograd, FK Novi Pazar, FK Mladost Apatin, FK Sloga Kraljevo, FK Šumadija Aranđelovac and FK Rudar Kostolac. Beside these, he also played with Bosnian Serb club FK Rudar Ugljevik in the Premier League of Bosnia and Herzegovina and with OFK Grbalj in the Montenegrin First League. He last played with FK Hajduk Veljko in the Serbian League East.

In September 2018 he became the director of the newly inaugurated Football Academy Benson in Jagodina.

In some sources his name is spelled as Victor Agboh, and in Serbia often Viktor Agbo.

References

External links
 Victor Agbo Stats at Utakmica.rs

Living people
1980 births
Sportspeople from Lagos
Nigerian footballers
Nigerian expatriate footballers
Association football forwards
FK BSK Borča players
FK Novi Pazar players
FK Mladost Apatin players
FK Sloga Kraljevo players
FK Jagodina players
Expatriate footballers in Serbia
FK Rudar Ugljevik players
Expatriate footballers in Bosnia and Herzegovina
OFK Grbalj players
Expatriate footballers in Montenegro
Expatriate footballers in Serbia and Montenegro